David Hoeschel (also Höschel) (8 April 1556, Augsburg – 19 October 1617, Augsburg) was a German librarian, editor and scholar.

He was a pupil of Hieronymus Wolf. While he was rector of the St. Anna Gymnasium in Augsburg, he founded in 1594 with Marcus Welser the press "Ad insigne pinus". Up to 1617 it produced about 70 works, among them being the editio princeps of the Bibliotheca of Photius I of Constantinople.

Notes

External links
:de:s:ADB:Höschel, David

1556 births
1617 deaths
German Renaissance humanists
German librarians
16th-century German educators
German classical scholars
German editors
Heads of schools in Germany